Thauera humireducens is a gram-negative, non-spore-forming, humus-reducing, rod-shaped, bacterium from the genus of Thauera which was isolated from a microbial fuel cell.

References

External links
Type strain of Thauera humireducens at BacDive -  the Bacterial Diversity Metadatabase

Rhodocyclaceae
Bacteria described in 2013